The neuropeptide FF receptors are members of the G-protein coupled receptor superfamily of integral membrane proteins which bind the pain modulatory neuropeptides AF and FF. 
The Neuropeptide FF receptor family is a member of the G protein-coupled receptor superfamily containing two subtypes, NPFF1 and NPFF2, which exhibit a high affinity for Neuropeptide FF (NPFF) peptides. NPFF1 is broadly distributed in the central nervous system with the highest levels found in the limbic system and the hypothalamus. NPFF2 is present in high density, particularly in mammals in the superficial layers of the spinal cord where it is involved in nociception and modulation of opioid functions. These receptors participate to the modulation of opioid receptor function in the brain and spinal cord, and can either reduce or increase opioid receptor function depending which tissue they are released in, reflecting a complex role for neuropeptide FF in pain responses.

NPFF receptors are coupled to G proteins and regulate adenylyl cyclase in recombinant cell lines (CHO, HEK 293, SH-SY5Y). NPFF receptors are also coupled to voltage-gated N-type Ca2+ channels.

Ligands

Agonists
 Neuropeptide AF
 Neuropeptide FF
 Neuropeptide SF (RFRP-1)
 Neuropeptide VF (RFRP-3)

Antagonists
 BIBP-3226 (mixed NPFF1 / NPY1 antagonist)
 RF-9

References

External links

 

G protein-coupled receptors